The Modistach "Quad" was an automobile built in Tanunda, South Australia by local blacksmith Frederick H Modistach (1882-1963) in 1901.
The car was a front engined, belt driven four-wheeler. The front wheels were supported by bicycle forks. Power came from a single cylinder 4.5 hp Automotor engine. The motor was originally air cooled with a basic form of water cooling being installed later in its development.

References

2. River News (Waikerie, SA) 9 August 1963
3. South Australia Dept of Planning, Transport and Infrastructure fact sheet.

Vintage vehicles
Cars of Australia